The Madagascar stonechat (Saxicola sibilla) is a species of stonechat, endemic to Madagascar. It is a small bird, closely similar to the African stonechat in both plumage and behaviour, but distinguished from it by the more extensive black on the throat and minimal orange-red on the upper breast of the males.

Taxonomy
In 1760 the French zoologist Mathurin Jacques Brisson included a description of the Madagascar stonechat in his Ornithologie based on a specimen collected in Madagascar. He used the French name Le traquet de Madagascar and the Latin Rubetra Madagascariensis. Although Brisson coined Latin names, these do not conform to the binomial system and are not recognised by the International Commission on Zoological Nomenclature. When in 1766 the Swedish naturalist Carl Linnaeus updated his Systema Naturae for the twelfth edition, he added 240 species that had been previously described by Brisson. One of these was the Madagascar stonechat. Linnaeus included a brief description, coined the binomial name Motacilla sibilla and cited Brisson's work. The specific name sibilla is from the Latin sibilare "to whistle".  This species is now placed in the genus Saxicola that was introduced by the German naturalist Johann Matthäus Bechstein in 1802.

The Madagascar stonechat has generally been considered a subspecies of African stonechat (as Saxicola torquatus sibilla), but recent genetic evidence has shown that it is distinct, more closely related to Reunion stonechat than it is to African stonechat, on which basis it is now accepted as a distinct species. Three subspecies are recognised.

References

External links
Xeno-canto: audio recordings of the Madagascan stonechat

Madagascar stonechat
Endemic birds of Madagascar
Madagascar stonechat
Madagascar stonechat